Davonn Harp is a Filipino-American former basketball player who played in the Philippine Basketball Association for the Batang Red Bull Energizers. He was one of the six players elevated by Red Bull from its PBL franchise. He played as a center. He was born on January 20, 1978, in Columbus, Ohio. He was the PBA Rookie of the Year for the 2000 PBA season.

References

1978 births
Living people
Allegany Trojans men's basketball players
American sportspeople of Filipino descent
Barako Bull Energy Boosters players
Basketball players from Columbus, Ohio
Centers (basketball)
Filipino men's basketball players
Citizens of the Philippines through descent
Kutztown Golden Bears men's basketball players
Philippine Basketball Association All-Stars
Power forwards (basketball)
Towson Tigers men's basketball players
American men's basketball players
Doping cases in basketball